Nyrki Tapiovaara, born 10 September 1911 in Pitäjänmäki, Helsinki, died 29 February 1940, was a Finnish film director. He belonged to the Tulenkantajat group which promoted modernist ideas in Finnish culture. Tapiovaara's film career only lasted four years and resulted in five feature films, but had a lasting effect on Finnish cinema. He died in the Winter War.

Filmography
 Juha (1937)
 The Stolen Death (Varastettu kuolema) (1938)
 Kaksi Vihtoria (Two Henpecked Husbands) (1939)
 Mr. Lahtinen Takes French Leave (Herra Lahtinen lähtee lipettiin) (1939)
 One Man's Fate (Miehen tie) (1940)

References

External links
 

1911 births
1940 deaths
Finnish film directors
Finnish military personnel killed in World War II
Finnish screenwriters
Film people from Helsinki
20th-century screenwriters